Roads in February is a 2018 Canadian drama film directed by Katherine Jerkovic. It was screened in the Contemporary World Cinema section at the 2018 Toronto International Film Festival, where it won the award for Best Canadian First Feature Film.

The film centres on Sara (Arlen Aguayo-Stewart), a young Hispanic Canadian woman visiting her grandmother in Uruguay.

Cast
 Arlen Aguayo-Stewart as Sara
 Gloria Demassi as Magda
 Mathias Perdigón as Tincho

Critical response
In December 2018, the Toronto International Film Festival named the film to its annual year-end Canada's Top Ten list. The Vancouver Film Critics Circle awarded Aguayo-Stewart as Best Actress in a Canadian Film and Jerkovic received the One to Watch Award.

Critical response to the film was positive. The Hollywood Reporter's Boyd Van Hoeij called it "a promising debut feature". And Norman Wilner from Now Toronto called Jerkovic "a gifted, intuitive storyteller who doesn't need to oversell her story's emotional undercurrents; she trusts her audience to understand what's going on simply by paying attention to her actors' faces". It scores  on Rotten Tomatoes.

References

External links
 
 

2018 films
2018 drama films
Spanish-language Canadian films
Canadian drama films
Films set in Uruguay
Films directed by Katherine Jerkovic
2010s Canadian films